The VIII Corps of the Ottoman Empire (Turkish: 8 nci Kolordu or Sekizinci Kolordu) was one of the corps of the Ottoman Army. It was formed in the early 20th century as part of the Ottoman military reforms.

Formation

Order of Battle, 1911 
With further reorganizations of the Ottoman Army, to include the creation of corps level headquarters, by 1911 the VIII Corps was headquartered in Damascus. The Corps before the First Balkan War in 1911 was structured as such:

VIII Corps, Damascus
25th Division, Dera
73rd Infantry Regiment, Dera
74th Infantry Regiment, Suveydiye
75th Infantry Regiment, Kerek
25th Rifle Battalion, Maan
25th Division Band, Dera
26th Division, Halep
76th Infantry Regiment, Halep
77th Infantry Regiment, Maraş
78th Infantry Regiment, Adana
26th Rifle Battalion, Halep
26th Field Artillery Regiment, Halep
26th Division Band, Halep
27th Division, Beyrut
79th Infantry Regiment, Hayfa
80th Infantry Regiment, Beyrut
81st Infantry Regiment, Kudüs
27th Rifle Battalion, Mesiha
27th Division Band, Beyrut
Units of VIII Corps
8th Rifle Regiment, Damascus
9th Cavalry Brigade, Damascus
28th Cavalry Regiment, Dera
29th Cavalry Regiment, Amman
30th Cavalry Regiment, Damascus
2nd Mountain Artillery Battalion, Damascus
8th Mountain Artillery Battalion, Damascus
6th Engineer Battalion, Humus
6th Transport Battalion, Damascus
Railroad Regiment, Medina

Balkan Wars

Order of Battle, 19 October 1912 
On 19 October 1912, the VIII Provisional Corps was placed under the Western Army and faced the Greek Army of Thessaly. Its composition was as follows:

22nd Regular (Nizamiye) Division
Nasliç Reserve (Redif) Division
Aydın  Reserve (Redif) Division

Order of Battle, July 1913 
VIII Corps (Syria)
25th Division, 26th Division

World War I

Order of Battle, August 1914 
In August 1914, the corps was structured as follows:

VIII Corps (Syria)
25th Division, 27th Division

Order of Battle, November 1914 
In November 1914, the corps was structured as follows:

VIII Corps (Syria)
23rd Division, 25th Division, 27th Division

Order of Battle, Late April 1915 
In Late April 1915, the corps was structured as follows:

VIII Corps (Syria)
8th Division, 10th Division, 23rd Division, 25th Division, 27th Division

Order of Battle, Late Summer 1915, January 1916 
In Late Summer 1915, January 1916, the corps was structured as follows:

VIII Corps (Syria-Palestine)
23rd Division, 24th Division, 27th Division

Order of Battle, August 1916, December 1916 
In August 1916, December 1916, the corps was structured as follows:

VIII Corps (Syria-Palestine)
3rd Division, 23rd Division, 24th Division, 27th Division

Order of Battle, August 1917 
In August 1917, the corps was structured as follows:

VIII Corps (Syria)
48th Division

Order of Battle, January 1918, June 1918 
In January 1918, the corps was structured as follows:

VIII Corps (Syria)
43rd Division, 48th Division

Order of Battle, January 1918, June 1918 
In June 1918, the corps was structured as follows:

VIII Corps (Palestine)
43rd Division, 48th Division

Order of Battle, September 1918 
In September 1918, the corps was structured as follows:

VIII Corps (Palestine)
48th Division, Provisional Infantry Division

Sources

Corps of the Ottoman Empire
Military units and formations of the Ottoman Empire in the Balkan Wars
Military units and formations of the Ottoman Empire in World War I
History of Damascus